Noodle is an unincorporated community in Jones County, Texas, United States.

History
A post office called Noodle was established in 1900, and remained in operation until it was discontinued in 1924. Noodle has been noted for its unusual place name. The name comes from nearby Noodle Creek, a dry creek named for the local term for "nothing" according to local history.

References

Unincorporated communities in Jones County, Texas
Unincorporated communities in Texas
1900 establishments in Texas